Gadzooks, Inc.  was a mall-based teenage clothing retailer. It was acquired by Forever 21 in 2005 and then shut down. Gadzooks stores had a life-size version of part of a Volkswagen Beetle inside. Dozens of the cars were sawed in half for use as displays throughout its locations during the 1990s.

History
The company was founded in 1983 as a T-shirt business by brothers-in-law Jerry Szczepanski and Larry Titus, and inspired by the shopping habits of Szczepanski's teenage sons. The first store was in Mesquite, Texas. In order to fill floorspace, the founders displayed an "old, white Volks-wagen bug" in the store.

By 1992, the company had 33 stores in Texas. In 1995, the company became a public company via an initial public offering and within three months, the share price quadrupled from $15 to $61. That year the company had 195 stores. In 2000, the company operated 330 Gadzooks in 35 states.

In 2003, in response to heightened competition, the company retooled, shifting from being a "mini-department store", and dropping its male clothing line, to focus exclusively on 16- to 22-year-old females, which proved a fatal shift in its viability. Gadzooks was one of the first national retail chains to adopt the teenage shopper as its target market.

In February 2004, the company filed bankruptcy and announced plans to reduce its store count from 410 to 252. In March 2005, Forever 21 purchased the chain for $33 million. The stores were eventually phased out.

References

1983 establishments in Texas
Defunct clothing retailers of the United States
American companies established in 1983
Retail companies established in 1983
Retail companies disestablished in 2005
Companies that filed for Chapter 11 bankruptcy in 2004
2005 mergers and acquisitions